Erik Matthew Howard (born November 12, 1964) is a former professional American football defensive tackle who played eleven seasons in the National Football League (NFL).  He played nine seasons with the Giants, and was a member of the teams that won Super Bowls XXI and XXV.

Howard graduated from Bellarmine Prep in San Jose, California, and played college football at Washington State University in Pullman under head coach Jim Walden. He was All-Pac-10 as a senior in 1985, and selected by the Giants in the second round of the 1986 NFL Draft, 46th overall.

In the 1990 NFC Championship game against the two-time defending NFL champion San Francisco 49ers, Howard came up with one of the biggest plays of the 1990 season and arguably the biggest play in Giants history.  With just under three minutes left in the game, the Giants trailed 13–12, and the 49ers had the game nearly wrapped up when Howard fought through a double-team block by 49ers' Guard Guy McIntyre and Center Jesse Sapolu to force running back Roger Craig to fumble the football after getting his helmet on the ball.  Teammate Lawrence Taylor fought through two blocks by 49ers' TE Brent Jones and RB Tom Rathman to get to the spot along the line of scrimmage where Craig was located to recover the fumble as the ball was forced out of Craig's grasp. The Giants went on to win the game on Matt Bahr's field goal, kicked with four seconds remaining to end the 49ers' bid for a three-peat.  The Giants went on to win Super Bowl XXV over the Buffalo Bills seven days later.

After the 1994 season, Howard signed with the New York Jets as a free agent and played with them for two years before deciding to retire. He currently resides in Marshall, Texas, with his wife Jennifer Howard and three children Jackson Howard, Katelynn Howard, and Keaton Howard.

Notes and references

External links
 

1964 births
Living people
Sportspeople from Pittsfield, Massachusetts
American football defensive tackles
American football defensive ends
Washington State Cougars football players
New York Giants players
New York Jets players
Players of American football from Massachusetts
National Conference Pro Bowl players
Ed Block Courage Award recipients